Jimson St. Louis (born December 2, 2002) is a United States Virgin Islands international soccer player who plays as a midfielder.

Youth Career
As a youth, St. Louis played for Laraza FC of the U.S. Virgin Islands Premier League for nine years. In 2019 St. Louis traveled to Spain with three other USVI youth players to trial with the academies of seven professional clubs.

College career
For the 2020 campaign, St. Louis committed to play college soccer for the Blackhawks of Southeastern Community College.

Career statistics

International

References

External links
 Jimson St. Louis at the Southeastern Community College of Iowa

2002 births
Living people
Southeastern Community College (Iowa) alumni
American soccer players
United States Virgin Islands soccer players
United States Virgin Islands international soccer players
Association football midfielders